The 2001 Kvalserien was the 27th edition of the Kvalserien. It determined two teams of the participating ones would play in the 2001–02 Elitserien season and which four teams would play in the 2001–02 Allsvenskan season.

Tournament

External links
Tournament on hockeyarchives.info

Kvalserien
Kval